Hermann Gehri (26 July 1899 – 25 November 1979) was a Swiss freestyle wrestler and Olympic champion. He received a gold medal at the 1924 Summer Olympics in Paris.

References

External links

1899 births
1979 deaths
Swiss wrestlers
Wrestlers at the 1924 Summer Olympics
Swiss male sport wrestlers
Olympic gold medalists for Switzerland
Olympic medalists in wrestling
Medalists at the 1924 Summer Olympics